Michael J. Merenda Jr. is a singer-songwriter with the American folk band, the Mammals. He plays guitar, banjo, ukulele and percussion. He also has a solo career and performs with the Jay Ungar and Molly Mason Family Band.

Merenda was raised in Durham, New Hampshire.  He is married to Ruth Ungar, daughter of Jay Ungar and Lyn Hardy.

Biography

Merenda grew up in Durham, New Hampshire, where his father is a faculty member at the University of New Hampshire. In 1998, he graduated with a creative writing degree from Bowdoin College in Maine and he then moved to New York City.

As a teenager Merenda started out playing guitar with the band Skarotum with his brother Chris. He started playing drums in elementary school, started playing the guitar in sixth grade and picked up the banjo after he met Ruth Ungar in 1998.

In 2000 Merenda moved to Western Massachusetts and in 2001 he, Ruth Ungar and Tao Rodriguez-Seeger started The Mammals.
As well as being a member of the Mammals, Merenda has an active solo career with three CDs in his own name.  He was supporting act for Dan Bern in November 2006.  In 2008 he and his wife released their first duo cd, The Honeymoon Agenda, on their own record label, Humble Abode Music. .

Notes

Discography

Solo

Trapped in the Valley (2000)
Election Day (2004)
Quiver (2006)

Mike and Ruthy
The Honeymoon Agenda (2008)
Waltz of the Chickadee (2009)
Million to One (2010)

With The Mammals
Born Live (2001)
Evolver (2002)
Migration (EP)(2004)
Rock That Babe (2004)
Departure (2006)

External links
 https://web.archive.org/web/20060618060903/http://www.michaelmerenda.com/
 http://www.mikeandruthy.com

American folk musicians
American multi-instrumentalists
1976 births
Bowdoin College alumni
Living people
American banjoists
American folk singers
American singer-songwriters
21st-century American singers